Up for a Bit with The Pastels is the debut album by the Scottish band The Pastels, released in 1987. It was named the 37th best Scottish album by The Scotsman.

Track listing
All songs written by Stephen McRobbie, except where noted.
"Ride" – 2:24
"Up for a Bit" (Martin Hayward, Bernice Simpson) – 3:36
"Crawl Babies" (Hayward, Simpson) – 2:45
"Address Book" (McRobbie, Brian Taylor) – 4:02
"I'm Alright with You" – 3:22
"Hitchin' a (Ride)" – 2:02
"Get 'Round Town" (McRobbie, Taylor)– 2:17
"Automatically Yours" – 2:43
"Baby Honey" (McRobbie, Taylor) – 5:52
"If I Could Tell You" (Hayward, Simpson) – 2:44

Personnel
 Stephen McRobbie (or Stephen Pastel) – guitar, vocals
 Brian Taylor (or Brian Superstar) – guitar
 Martin Hayward – bass, vocals
 Bernice Simpson – drums
 Annabel Wright – vocals, percussion, keyboards, artwork
 John A. Rivers – producer, keyboards

References

1987 debut albums
The Pastels albums
Glass Records albums
Fire Records (UK) albums
Albums produced by John A. Rivers